Laping is a spicy cold mung bean noodle dish in Tibetan cuisine. It is a street food and is popular in Nepal. It can be eaten with red pepper chili, coriander and green onion sauce. The noodles have a slippery texture and are served with a soy sauce gravy. It is traditionally a summer food. A tool is used to shape it. The laping derives from the Sichuan-style liangfen.

See also

 Cheungfan
 Liangfen
 Nokdu-muk

References

External links
Laping making YouTube video by Mark Wiens September 1, 2013 
Laping Tibetan Food: How to make Tibetan-Style Laping: Cold Mung-Bean Noodles YouTube video YoWangdu Tibetan Culture

Tibetan cuisine
Nepalese cuisine
Legume dishes
Mixed noodles